Malakasa is a village and former community of East Attica in Greece. Since the 2011 local government reform it is part of the municipality Oropos, of which it is a municipal unit. The municipal unit has an area of 10.450 km2. The municipal unit Malakasa consists of the villages Malakasa (pop. 514 in 2011), Milesi (425) and Sfendali (110). 

Malakasa is situated on the northern edge of the Parnitha mountain range and 9 km south of the South Euboean Gulf coast. It is 29 km north of Athens city center. Motorway 1 (Athens - Thessaloniki) passes south of the town. The Greek National Road 79 links Malakasa with Nea Palatia on the coast. Sfendali has a station on the railway from Athens to Thessaloniki.

History
The village was founded by the incoming Albanian tribe of the Malakasioi, as can be seen in its name. Malakasa has historically been an Arvanite settlement.

Historical population

References

Bibliography

External links
GTP Travel Pages (Municipality) (in English and Greek)
dhmoi.gr - Malakassa

Oropos
Populated places in East Attica
Arvanite settlements